"Old Man Trump" is a song with lyrics written by American folk singer-songwriter Woody Guthrie in 1954. The song describes the racist housing practices and discriminatory rental policies of his landlord, Fred Trump. Although the lyrics were written in 1954, it was never recorded by Guthrie. In January 2016, Will Kaufman, a Guthrie scholar and professor of American literature and culture at the University of Central Lancashire, unearthed the handwritten lyrics while conducting research at the Woody Guthrie Archives in Tulsa, Oklahoma.

In partnership with the Guthrie archives and the Guthrie family, Woody's words have been put to music by California rock band U.S. Elevator, fronted by Johnny Irion, who is married to Sarah Lee Guthrie, Woody's granddaughter. "Old Man Trump" has also been recorded by riot folk singer Ryan Harvey with Ani DiFranco and guitarist Tom Morello, as well as by independent artist/musician Chip Godwin.

Background
In December 1950, Woody Guthrie signed a lease at the Beach Haven apartment complex owned and operated by Fred Trump in Gravesend, Brooklyn. There are several handwritten drafts of the lyrics with titles such as "Beach Haven Race Hate" and "Beach Haven Ain't My Home". In its lyrics, Guthrie expresses his dissatisfaction with Trump and the "color line" he had drawn in his Brooklyn neighborhood:

The Federal Housing Administration, which fronted the bill for some of Trump's housing projects, had a set of guidelines for avoiding integration which Trump enthusiastically embraced.

"He thought that Fred Trump was one who stirs up racial hate, and implicitly profits from it," the scholar, Will Kaufman, said. In Guthrie's notebooks he wrote about wanting to put an end to the segregation with "a face of every bright color laffing and joshing in these old darkly weeperish empty shadowed windows."

An unreleased variant of Guthrie's "Ain't Got No Home" similarly protests Fred Trump's segregation at Beach Haven.

See also
 Residential segregation in the United States

References

Woody Guthrie songs
Songs written by Woody Guthrie
1954 songs
Songs against racism and xenophobia
Songs about landlords
Protest songs
Cultural depictions of American men
Unreleased songs